William Stone Hubbell (April 19, 1837 – August 28, 1930) was a United States Army captain during the American Civil War, and a recipient of the Medal of Honor.

Biography
Hubbell entered army service at North Stonington (New London County), Connecticut.

Captain Hubbell served in Company A of the 21st Connecticut Infantry at the Battle of Chaffin's Farm. In that battle on September 30, 1864, at Fort Harrison, Virginia, he led out a small flanking party, engaged a Confederate force and at great risk captured a large number of prisoners. For this action, Hubbell was awarded the Medal of Honor on June 13, 1894.

William Stone Hubbell died on August 28, 1930. He is buried in Indian Hill Cemetery, Middletown, Connecticut.

Medal of Honor citation
Rank and organization: Captain, Company A, 21st Connecticut Infantry. Place and date: At Fort Harrison, Va., September 30, 1864. Entered service at: North Stonington, Conn. Born: April 19, 1837, Wolcottville, Conn. Date of issue: June 13, 1894.

Citation:
Led out a small flanking party and by a clash and at great risk captured a large number of prisoners.

See also

List of American Civil War Medal of Honor recipients: G–L
William Spring Hubbell (1801–1873), American politician, congressman from New York

Notes

1837 births
1930 deaths
Burials at Indian Hill Cemetery
United States Army Medal of Honor recipients
People of Connecticut in the American Civil War
Union Army officers
American Civil War recipients of the Medal of Honor
Military personnel from Connecticut